Warburton is a civil parish in the Metropolitan Borough of Trafford, Greater Manchester, England.  It contains 22 listed buildings that are recorded in the National Heritage List for England. Of these, one is listed at Grade I, the highest of the three grades, and the others are at Grade II, the lowest grade.  The parish contains the village of Warburton, and is otherwise rural.  Most of the listed buildings are houses, farmhouses and farm buildings.  The other listed buildings include churches and associated structures, a war memorial, and an enclosure containing stocks and a cross base, with its wall also listed.


Key

Buildings

References

Citations

Sources

Lists of listed buildings in Greater Manchester